Opera is an art form in which singers and musicians perform a dramatic work (called an opera), which combines a text (called a libretto) and a musical score. Opera is part of the Western classical music tradition. While the scale of opera can be larger or smaller—there are many different genres of opera—performance typically involves different types of artist (singers, instrumentalists and often dancers and actors) and technical staff. Usually an orchestra led by a conductor accompanies the singers. In contrast to spoken theatre, the opera world is international. Italian, German, French, English, and Russian works are performed worldwide in their original languages, and artists travel from country to country performing.

The following is a list of articles on general opera topics:

Essence of opera

History of opera

 Origins of opera
 Querelle des Bouffons

Opera in different national traditions
Operas have been written in a diversity of languages with many countries or regions developing their own operatic style, tradition and history.

Component parts
 
 Overture
 French
 Italian
 Aria
 Aria di sorbetto
 Arioso
 Cabaletta
 Cantabile
 Catalogue aria
 Da capo aria
 Insertion aria
 Rage aria
 Cavatina
 Intermezzo
 Mad scene
 Recitative
 Chorus
 Ballet

Operatic genres

Over the centuries, the original form of opera, as established by Claudio Monteverdi and his contemporaries, has diversified into distinct and recognisable genres, in addition to the national traditions listed above. These include, but are not limited to, the following.

 Azione teatrale
 Ballad opera
 Chamber opera
 Comic opera
 Dramma giocoso
 Duodrama
 Farsa
 Festa teatrale
 Grand opera
 Literaturoper
 Monodrama
 Music drama
 Opéra-ballet
 Opera buffa
 Opéra bouffe
 Opéra bouffon
 Opéra comique
 Opéra féerie
 Opera semiseria
 Opera seria
 Operetta
 Pasticcio
 Pastorale héroïque
 Radio opera
 Rescue opera
 Romantische Oper
 Sainete
 Savoy opera
 Science fiction opera
 Semi-opera
 Singspiel
 Spieloper
 Tragédie en musique
 Verismo
 Zarzuela
 Zeitoper

General opera concepts

Music concepts relevant to opera
 
 Concert version  
 Libretto
Electronic libretto  
 Offstage instrument or choir part
 Tessitura
 Vocal range
 Vocal weight
 Voice type, the classification of singers by the range, weight, and color of their voices

Theatre concepts relevant to opera

Opera house

 Auditorium
Box
Gallery
 Backstage facilities
Green room
 Orchestra pit
 Stage
Fly system
Footlight
Prompt corner
Revolving stage
Safety curtain
Stage curtain
Star trap

People in opera

Opera composers, librettists, directors
 List of major opera composers – an annotated compilation of the most frequently named composers on ten lists by opera experts.
 List of opera librettists – inclusive list of libretto writers.
 List of opera directors (in the sense of stage director, not general manager or general director (often also called opera director).

Opera singers categories
 
 Boy soprano 
 Soprano
 Coloratura
 Soubrette
 Lyric
 Spinto
 Dramatic
 Soprano sfogato
 Mezzo-soprano
 Contralto (Alto)
 Castrato
 Countertenor
 Sopranist
 Tenor 
 Haute-contre
 Tenore contraltino
 Tenore di grazia
 Baritenor
 Baritone
 Bass-baritone
 Bass
 Basso profondo

Participants in opera
The participants in an opera performance are similar to, but more specialized than those in other theatrical productions. Opera performers are at the same time both singers and actors, and often dancers as well.

Other participants are:

Opera lists
 List of Christmas operas
 List of fictional literature featuring opera
 List of films based on operas
 List of historical opera characters
 List of important operas – an annotated chronological list of operas which are included for their historical significance or widespread popularity (or both).
 List of opera festivals
 List of opera genres
 List of opera houses – lists opera houses by name (or name of performing arts centres in which they are located, if appropriate and best known that way).
 List of operas by composer – an extended list of more than 2,300 works by more than 720 composers.
 List of operas by title – an alphabetical list by title of operas with Wikipedia articles.
 List of operas set in the Crusades
 List of Orphean operas – list of operas dealing with the myth of Orpheus.
 List of radio operas
 List of television operas
 Lists of opera companies

Opera discographies
 Opera discographies

Books about opera
 The Complete Opera Book
 The New Grove Dictionary of Opera
 Opera and Drama

Films about opera
 Il Bacio di Tosca
 Karajan: The Maestro and His Festival
 Pappano's Essential Ring Cycle
 This is Opera
 Wagner's Dream

See also

 Glossary of music terms – list of music topics, with definitions for ease of reference
 Country house opera
 Opera film

References

Additional sources
 
 
 
 
 
 Warrack, John and West, Ewan (1992), The Oxford Dictionary of Opera, 782 pages,

External links
 Operabase – database for opera companies, artists, managers and performances
 OperaGlass – a resource at Stanford University including libretti, source texts, performance histories, synopses, discographies and lists of rôle creators.
 Operissimo – resource for composers and works as well as houses, companies and artists.